In the Dungeons & Dragons (D&D) fantasy role-playing game, dragons are an iconic type of monstrous creature. As a group, D&D dragons are loosely based on dragons from a wide range of fictional and mythological sources. Dungeons & Dragons allows players to fight the fictional dragons in the game (Tiamat being one of the most notable) and "slay their psychic dragons" as well.  These dragons, specifically their "dungeon ecology", have implications for the literary theory of fantasy writing. D&D dragons also featured as targets of the moral panic surrounding the game.

In D&D, dragons are depicted as any of various species of large, intelligent, magical, reptilian beasts, each typically defined by a combination of their demeanor and either the color of their scales or their elemental affinity. For example, a commonly presented species of dragon is the red dragon, which is named for its red scales, and known for its evil and greedy nature, as well as its ability to breathe fire. In the game, dragons are usually adversaries of player characters, and less commonly, allies or helpers. Even though dragons are iconic for the D&D game, they are rarely encountered as part of official scenarios due to dragons typically being too powerful for low-level players. An exception to this is the Dragonlance game world.

Classification 
Powerful and intelligent, dragons are usually winged reptiles with magical abilities and breath weapons. The different subraces, distinguished by their coloring, vary in power.

In the D&D universe, there are many different species of dragons. However, despite their variety, a number of traits are common to nearly all types of dragons. All species appear to be generally reptilian or serpentine in their natural form. Except for the youngest dragons, they tend to be quite large—usually at least as big as a horse, and often much larger. Most species depicted have wings and are able to fly, and nearly all are quadrupedal. Almost all species of dragon are highly intelligent (at least as intelligent as a human being) and are able to speak. Essentially, all species of dragon are said to be magical in nature, and in most species this nature is expressed as an affinity for some type of elemental power. Some dragon species are naturally able to cast magical spells as well. Most dragons have the ability to breathe or expel one or more types of energy associated with their elemental affinity, as well as bearing some resistance to damage or injury from any other sources of such energy. Dragons are egg-layers, and most have sharp teeth, horns, and claws. A D&D dragon is protected by its scaly hide, the color of which is determined by the dragon's species, and which also offers a visual clue to the specific elemental nature of each species of dragon. Each species of dragon has a particular temperament associated with it, as well as a deeply rooted moral outlook derived from that temperament; these factors underlie the personality and behavior of each individual dragon. Typically, dragons do not vary widely in appearance or personality within a species, although exceptions are possible, especially in certain D&D settings, such as Eberron.

Because D&D dragons are essentially monstrous creatures designed to antagonize player characters, the majority of dragons in D&D are evil by default. This was particularly the case in the original Dungeons & Dragons releases (such as the Dungeons & Dragons "white box" set (1974) and Dungeons & Dragons Basic Set) where only the gold dragon was lawful good while all other colors were chaotic evil (red, green, black) or neutral evil (blue, white).

Some dragons (particularly metallic dragons) have two different kinds of breath, usually a lethal one (fire, ice, acid, lightning, etc.) and another that is typically non-lethal (paralysis, repulsion, confusion, etc.).

In the second edition of Advanced Dungeons & Dragons (AD&D), dragons were altered heavily from their first edition equivalents and were made much more powerful with magic resistance, removing the subdual rules, and now had more physical attack forms besides claws and bites.

AD&D 2nd edition and D&D 3rd edition divided true dragons further into three main categories: chromatic dragons, such as green and black dragons, which are evil-aligned; metallic dragons, such as gold and silver dragons, which are good; and neutral-aligned gem dragons, rare creatures that possess psionic abilities. In addition, there were other subspecies of true dragons that did not fit into the three main categories. For example, mercury and steel dragons would seem to be metallic dragons, but in the Dungeons & Dragons world they are considered to be outside of the main family of metallic dragons because of various biological differences (though the book Dragons of Faerûn did list them as metallic dragons). The "lung dragons" or spirit-dragons of Oriental Adventures are also true dragons.

The third edition of D&D classifies dragon as a type of creature, simply defined as "a reptilelike creature, usually winged, with magical or unusual abilities".  The dragon type is broken down into several classifications. True dragons are dragons which increase in power by age categories (wyrmling to great wyrm). Lesser dragons do not improve in age categories and may lack all of the abilities of true dragons. Examples of lesser dragons include dragon turtles and wyverns. Other creatures with the dragon type include drakes, felldrakes, elemental drakes, landwyrms, linnorms and wurms.  (An unrelated creature called a dragonne is named for its coincidental resemblance to a brass dragon.)

However, with D&D 4th edition, the classifications were changed: chromatic dragons turned not strictly evil, and metallic dragons proved not necessarily good. Also, there are several new categories (although the gem dragons did not return): "planar dragons" which are defined as dragons that were warped by living on a plane of existence other than the Material Plane, "catastrophe dragons", which take on the aspects of natural disasters which are chaotic evil and cause chaos for its own sake, and "scourge dragons". Chromatic dragons are presented in the Monster Manual and Draconomicon: Chromatic Dragons. Metallic dragons are presented in the Monster Manual 2 and Draconomicon: Metallic Dragons. Catastrophe dragons are presented in Monster Manual 3. Planar dragons have been presented in both Draconomicon: Chromatic Dragons and Draconomicon: Metallic Dragons.

Detailed information about D&D dragonkind in second, third, or fourth editions may be found in their respective editions of the Draconomicon, a D&D supplement book designed especially for draconic information; fifth edition has the similarly-themed Fizban's Treasury of Dragons. No such book was published for the first edition, although the Basic game had a Bestiary of Dragons and Giants (coded AC10).

Publication history
Five evil-aligned dragons (white dragon, black dragon, green dragon, blue dragon, and red dragon), and the lawful-good aligned golden dragon (in ascending order of magic power and capabilities) first appeared in the original Dungeons & Dragons "white box" set (1974). The Greyhawk Campaign supplement (1975) added the copper dragon, brass dragon, bronze dragon, and silver dragon, along with the Platinum Dragon (Bahamut) and the Chromatic Dragon (Tiamat).

The white dragon, black dragon, red dragon and brass dragon reappeared in the original Dungeons & Dragons Basic Set (1977). The six dragons from the 1974 boxed set appeared in the Dungeons & Dragons Basic Rulebook (1981), and again in the 1983 version of the Basic Set (1983). These six appeared along with the gemstone dragons (crystal dragon, onyx dragon, jade dragon, sapphire dragon, ruby dragon and amber dragon), and the dragon rulers (Pearl (the Moon Dragon), Ruler of all Chaotic Dragons; Diamond (the Star Dragon), Ruler of all Lawful Dragons; Opal (the Sun Dragon), Ruler of all Neutral Dragons; and the Great One, Ruler of All Dragonkind) in the Dungeons & Dragons Rules Cyclopedia (1991).

The five chaotic-aligned dragon types from the 1974 boxed set, as well as the gold dragon and the four new dragon types from the Greyhawk supplement (the copper dragon, brass dragon, bronze dragon, and silver dragon) appeared in first edition Advanced Dungeons & Dragons in the original Monster Manual (1977), along with Bahamut and Tiamat. The former five dragon types were given as evil-aligned, while the latter five dragon types were given as good-aligned. The ten dragon types were given pseudoscientific names as follows: black (draco causticus sputem), blue (draco electricus), brass (draco impudentus gallus), bronze (draco gerus bronzo), copper (draco comes stabuli), gold (draco orientalus sino dux), green (draco chlorinous nauseous respiratorus), red (draco conflagratio horriblis), silver (draco nobilis argentum), and white (draco rigidus frigidus). The Oriental dragons appeared in the original Fiend Folio (1981), including the li lung (earth dragon), the lung wang (sea dragon), the pan lung (coiled dragon), the shen lung (spirit dragon), the t'ien lung (celestial dragon), and the yu lung (carp dragon).  The cloud dragon, the faerie dragon, the mist dragon, and the shadow dragon appeared in the original Monster Manual II (1983).

The black dragon, blue dragon, brass dragon, bronze dragon, copper dragon, gold dragon, green dragon, red dragon, silver dragon, and white dragon appeared in second edition Advanced Dungeons & Dragons in the Monstrous Compendium Volume One (1989). The faerie dragon, and the Oriental dragons—lung wang (sea dragon), pan lung (coiled dragon), shen lung (spirit dragon), t'ien lung (celestial dragon), tun mi lung (typhoon dragon), yu lung (carp dragon), chiang ling (river dragon), and li lung (earth dragon)—appeared in the Monstrous Compendium Forgotten Realms Appendix (1989). The radiant dragon appeared in the Spelljammer: AD&D Adventures in Space boxed set (1989). The dragons of Krynn', the amphi dragon, the astral dragon, the kodragon, the othlorx dragon, and the sea dragon appeared in the Monstrous Compendium Dragonlance Appendix (1990). The cloud  dragon, the Greyhawk dragon, the mist dragon, and the shadow dragon appeared in the Monstrous Compendium Greyhawk Appendix (1990). The adamantite dragon appeared in the Monstrous Compendium Outer Planes Appendix (1991). The moon dragon, the sun dragon, and the stellar dragon appeared in the Monstrous Compendium Spelljammer Appendix (1991). The deep dragon appeared in the Monstrous Compendium Forgotten Realms Appendix II (1991). The gem dragons (the amethyst dragon, the crystal dragon, the emerald dragon, the sapphire dragon, and the topaz dragon) first appeared in The Dragon magazine #037 (May 1980), and then appeared again in the Monstrous Compendium Fiend Folio Appendix (1992). The chromatic dragons (black dragon, blue dragon, green dragon, red dragon, and white dragon), the gem dragons (amethyst dragon, crystal dragon, emerald dragon, sapphire dragon, and topaz dragon), metallic dragons (brass dragon, bronze dragon, copper dragon, gold dragon, and silver dragon), brown dragon, cloud dragon, deep dragon, mercury dragon, mist dragon, shadow dragon, steel dragon, and yellow dragon appeared in the Monstrous Manual (1993). The onyx dragon, jade dragon, ruby dragon and amber dragon appeared in the Monstrous Compendium Mystara Appendix (1994).

The chromatic dragons (black, blue, green, red, and white), and the metallic dragons (brass, bronze, copper, gold, and silver) appeared in the third edition in the Monster Manual (2000), and in the revised 3.5 Monster Manual (2003). The Gem dragons appeared in the third edition in the Monster Manual II.

The five chromatic dragon types  (black, blue, green, red, and white) appeared in young, adult, elder, and ancient variants in the fourth edition Monster Manual (2008). Three more chromatic dragon types appeared in Draconomicon: Chromatic Dragons: the brown dragon (aka, sand dragon), the grey dragon (aka, fang dragon), and the purple dragon (aka, deep dragon). The adamantine dragon, copper dragon, gold dragon, iron dragon, and silver dragon appeared in the Monster Manual 2 (2009).

The five basic chromatic dragons (red, blue, green, black, and white) and metallic dragons (copper, brass, silver, gold, and bronze) appeared in the fifth edition Monster Manual (2014) in wyrmling, young, adult, and ancient. Gem dragons and other new-to-fifth-edition dragons appeared in Fizban's Treasury of Dragons (2021).

Abilities 
In D&D, true dragons continue to become more powerful as they mature and age; they grow bigger and stronger, become more resistant to damage and magic, their breath weapon become increasingly dangerous and their knowledge and magical abilities improves. Old dragons can cast draconic magic which is a special form of D&D magic; dragons can cast spells with just a few words, rather than a sometimes long and complex ritual involving words, gestures and preparations like other D&D wizards. In 3 and 3.5 editions dragons cast spells spontaneously like sorcerers do, sometimes having a wider choice of spells. Dragons also radiate a mystical fear aura around them. After a millennium or two, a dragon reaches his maximum development. In the Draconomicon, there is also an article about Advanced Dragons, dragons that have reached their oldest age category but can still advance "virtual age categories", and become larger and stronger.

Many D&D dragons have some innate magical abilities, but they vary from race to race. Metallic dragons are often able to shapechange into small animals or human forms, and use this ability to secretly help or watch over humans. Dragons also have some innate powers over the element they are linked to. For example, a red dragon (fire) will have some control over fires. Like all other draconic powers, they gain more as they grow older. Lesser dragons, for example wyverns, halfdragons or dragonwrought kobolds may lack innate magical abilities, while still counting as dragons for purpose of all other effects.

Breath weapon

A breath weapon is the cone or line shaped weapon exhaled by dragons in D&D.  Each type of dragon has a different breath weapon.  The chromatic dragons (evil) have one breath weapon and the metallic dragons (good) have two.  Other dragons and semi-dragons frequently have breath weapons.  One example is the dragon turtle's cone of steam breath weapon.

Form

Breath weapons typically come in one of three forms.
 Line: Does damage in a straight line.  For example, the blue dragon's line of lightning.
 Cone: Does damage in a wide cone shape.  For example, the red dragon's cone of fire.
 Cloud: Does damage with a cloud of gas.  For example, the green dragon's cloud of chlorine gas. This shape has not appeared in fifth edition.

Composition

Breath weapons typically are composed of one of several materials (gem dragons may have breath weapons of other materials, such as psychic energy and thunderous bursts of sound).
 Fire: Magical fire is used by gold dragons, brass dragons and red dragons.
 Electricity: Lightning is exhaled by blue dragons and bronze dragons.
 Acid: The black and copper dragon exhale a powerful acid.
 Poison: The green dragon's breath weapon is a cloud of chlorine gas.
 Cold: The white and silver dragons both release a cone of sub zero air and ice.

Magic 

True dragons are born with a natural flair for magic, but they need to practice and hone their skills and come of age before they are able to use it to any meaningful effect.

Biology 
D&D dragons are able to eat almost everything, but each race has a preferred diet (some prefer flesh, other prefer to eat precious metals or gems, and so forth).

Dragons are inherently magical beings and are cold blooded reptiles. They have no biological relationship to mammals.

The number of eggs laid each time depends on the race of the dragon, but is usually low (between one and ten). Dragons can also cross-breed with virtually any other creature, creating a half-dragon. The most commonly heard of are in the humanoid races, particularly with human and elves. Nearly any combination is possible, even with devils or angels.

As far as senses, which vary slightly depending on species, they are superior in most ways to other creatures; like any predator, they have exceptionally acute senses, which only increase with age. Like avian creatures, they have excellent depth perception and comparingly good peripheral vision, able to see twice as well as a human in daylight; unlike avian, they have great night vision, and are able to see even when conditions have no light to offer, although in such conditions they cannot discern between colors.

In some editions, dragons can also pick up scents very well, utilizing both their sensitive nose and (often forked) tongue, much like a snake. In the 3.5 edition Monster Manual they do not have the Scent extraordinary ability [q.v.], so that a dragon's sense of smell does not markedly exceed a human's.

Also, a dragon's hearing is roughly on par with human hearing, although a dragon's mind can filter what noise it hears. They are capable of "blindsense", the sense in which eyes, ears, and other senses are used to detect invisible persons or objects. Dragon taste is also refined, although they do not respond well to sweet flavors, and most dragons do not discuss the matter as to why. Of all its senses, a dragon's sense of touch is the only one to decrease throughout age, thanks mostly to the development of thick, hard scales.

Dragon personalities 
All true dragons in Dungeons & Dragons are depicted as intelligent beings, and most of them exceedingly so. A dragon's personality varies by individual, but dragons of the same subrace tend to have similar mindsets. This is not always true; several exceptions exist in official D&D material. In the Forgotten Realms, a good-aligned red dragon is involved against his will in the Fall of the elven city of Myth Drannor.

Dragon subraces encompass all D&D alignments, going from lawful good paladin-like gold dragons to the cruel and very greedy chaotic evil red dragons.

All dragons share a common desire to collect treasure, be it precious, beautiful, magical or just shiny—indeed, the treasure in question needn't always be gold, and may sometimes be aesthetic in nature, ranging from popular artwork or sculptures or even rare books and tomes that might otherwise have an overwhelming monetary value. For evil-aligned dragons, this generally directs a greedy attitude to achieve such wealth by whatever means suit them.  For good dragons this lust for treasure is tempered, although they are certainly not averse to earning such wealth, and still appreciate gifts (while being insulted if offered an obvious bribe).

Being stronger, faster, generally smarter, and possessing longer life than humans and most other races, dragons tend to consider themselves superior creatures. For good-aligned dragons, this may only mean they often consider humanoid races as children, trying to take care of them and educate them; for evil-aligned dragons, they consider humanoids as mere animals, or as toys to play with; at best, they are minions and slaves, while at worst, they are the dragon's next dinner.

The longevity of dragons is evident in their often lackadaisical attitudes. Good-aligned dragons, while concerned with defeating evil, are able to see a much broader scope of the world, and although certain crises arise that may seem extremely important to good-aligned humans, their dragon counterparts are able to see the event as an unimportant hiccup that will pass in mere centuries; even those that adventure with others tend show a sense of incredible patience, even in situations where all others feel they've not a second to lose. Similarly, evil-aligned dragons that are crossed by belligerent adventurers may plot for dozens of generations before exacting revenge on the trespasser's line—it is not uncommon for those descended from the mentioned adventurer to find themselves the target of a dragon based simply on their lineage.

In campaign settings 
In many settings, the god-king of the metallic dragons is Bahamut, the Platinum Dragon, and the goddess and queen of the chromatic dragons is Tiamat, the Five-Headed Dragon. She is based on the Tiamat from Babylonian mythology, who was considered the evil mother of dragons, though the appearances of the fictional deity differs greatly from its model.

The progenitor and supreme deity of all dragons in the game is known as Io. Other deities often included in the draconic pantheon of gods include Aasterinian, Chronepsis, and Faluzure.  Other draconic gods may be present in different campaign settings.

Dragonlance setting 
The Dragonlance novels and campaign setting helped popularize the D&D-derived perspective on dragons. Here the Platinum Dragon is called Paladine, and the Dragon Queen is called Takhisis.  Dragons are divided up into good and evil groups, known as the Metallic Dragons and the Chromatic Dragons, respectively.  Paladine leads the Metallic Dragons and Takhisis the Chromatic.  The Metallic Dragons rarely became involved in the world other than to oppose the actions of Chromatic Dragons, who often joined into war as their goddess Takhisis instructed.  However, in the "Fifth Age", massive Chromatic Dragons who were not native to Krynn emerged and took over many of the humanoid-controlled nations of Krynn, as well as slaying many of the native dragons.  They are known as Dragon Overlords.  There was one from each race of Chromatic Dragons; red, green, black, white, and blue.

Dark Sun setting 
In the world of Athas of the Dark Sun campaign setting, normal D&D dragons do not exist. Dragon-like drake races exist, one for each classical element, but for most people the word dragon refers to the Dragon of Tyr, who is a very powerful sorcerer-king (the tyrannic leaders of Athasian cities, who are both masters of magic and psi abilities) who transformed himself into a dragon-like creature using very powerful (and painful) magic. However, this dragon (Bors or Borys) was eventually killed in Troy Denning's book The Cerulean Storm by his former master, the sorcerer Rajaat. Several other sorcerer kings had been rumored to be dragons, but all others were only in a process of being transformed into a dragon type being, unique to the Athas world, which took several long stages to complete, but became greatly powerful if achieved.

Forgotten Realms setting 
In the Forgotten Realms campaign setting, dragons are very close to the ones in Dragonlance. A sect of cultists called the Cult of the Dragon believes that dragons, particularly undead ones, will rule the world, and are trying to persuade evil dragons to become dracoliches—undead lich-like dragons, which are partially bound to the cult by the rituals which grant them their undead status. Additionally, in the D&D supplement book The Draconomicon, several other undead varieties of the dragon – ghost, skeleton, vampire, and zombie dragons – are described.

A series called Wyrms of the North ran in Dragon magazine issues #230 through #259 and was later updated to third edition rules on Wizards of the Coast's website (see external links).  Each article detailed an individual dragon of significance in Faerûn.

Lately an ancient affliction that attacks dragons, rendering them mad; the Dracorage, was invoked causing countless dragons to rampage throughout Faerûn. A novel trilogy, The Year of Rogue Dragons set (The Rage, The Rite, and The Ruin) by Richard Lee Byers, as well as a game accessory, Dragons of Faerûn, details the exploits and deeds of several dragons as the Dracorage swept the continent.

World of Greyhawk setting 
Steel dragons, originally known as Greyhawk dragons, are those originating in the World of Greyhawk campaign setting, later appearing in other settings like the Forgotten Realms. They have hair-like spines around their heads, cat-like bodies with vaguely human-like faces, and scales resembling steel armor. They are much like the other races of metallic dragon with one primary exception: they prefer to maintain the form of another sentient race in order to mingle with, infiltrate, and study the cultures of men and their ilk. Few people know when they are interacting with a Steel Dragon, but they always have a feature which betrays them by resembling their natural complexion. Within the Greyhawk setting, such dragons are known to have made journeys into other material planes where they have come to be called steel dragons.

Council of Wyrms setting 
The Council of Wyrms campaign setting is the only one that allows for dragon player characters in its base rules. (The Draconomicon introduces rules for dragon PCs in standard Dungeons & Dragons.) The setting is based around a society of dragons and their servitors and uses the standard D&D dragon races and dragon gods. It has detailed rules for creating and playing dragon PCs and NPCs, including various draconic character classes.

Eberron setting 
In the Eberron campaign setting, three dragon gods have created the world: Siberys, Eberron and Khyber. Siberys and Eberron waged war against Khyber and imprisoned it within the depths of the earth. In the end, all three dragons merged with the land: Siberys becoming the sky, Eberron the continents and Khyber the underground world.

Dragons are apart from civilization, which is mostly concentrated on the continent of Khorvaire. They live on the continent of Argonnessen, a rather unknown place, since dragons are very territorial, it makes exploration often hazardous. The dragons used to rule over Eberron many centuries ago, but at the end of the Dragon-Fiend war, against the demons and devils of Khyber, they departed from Khorvaire to go to Argonnessen.

Dragons are immersed in the Draconic Prophecy, a legend which all bits of information are scattered throughout the world and that the outcome is unknown. They see every event as an important event in the Prophecy, and they even form an organization called the Chamber, where they send their brethren in search of clues. They can be of any alignment, like any creature in Eberron, so a good red dragon (usually evil) is as common as an evil gold dragon (usually good). This rule might throw some players off-balance. Dragons also consider themselves superior, treating all other races as inferior. Furthermore, any half-dragon spotted by these dragons is vowed to be hunted, as they treat these half-breeds as a disgrace to their image.

Birthright setting 
The Birthright campaign setting had its own version of a Dragon, named Cerilian Dragon, Cerilia being the main continent in the setting. They resemble more the eastern-type dragons being long and serpentine with leathery wings. Their backs are protected by iron-hard scales, their bellies by layers of thick, leathery skin. Their color ranges from reddish rust-brown to iron gray, with their bellies usually of a paler tone than their scales. Cerilian dragons are among the most ancient inhabitants of the continent, predating even elves and dwarves. Perhaps once there were many, but over the years, in-fighting and fighting the younger races have taken their toll. There are only a half dozen dragons known to be left. All living dragons are of the Old age or higher. Dragons are extremely intelligent and knowledgeable, conserving much lore that has been lost to the younger races. They speak their own language; some also speak Elven or Dwarven. Some of these dragons took part in the Battle of Deismaar, the only verified alive and awake dragons right now are the dragon of Vstaive Peaks in Vosgaard, also known as Vore Lekiniskiy and Kappenkriaucheran who inhabits the Drachenward mountains and controls their magic. The most famous of the dragons is Tarazin the Grey who has not been seen for several decades when the official campaign begins. The only known Dracolich is Komassa who lives in the Shadow World. Dragons in Birthright are meant to be rare and powerful beings and only rarely if ever appear in any adventure.

True dragons
In most descriptions, true dragons only comprise the two families of chromatic dragons and metallic dragons. There are, however, many more families among the true dragons, and some kinds exists outside any specific category.

Chromatic dragons
A Chromatic dragon is a classification of fictional dragon. Chromatic dragons are typically of evil alignment, in contrast to the metallic dragons, which are typically of good alignment. Chromatic dragons have played a large role in various D&D monster compilation books: white, black, green, blue and red dragons being the classic chromatic dragons. Tiamat is the queen of chromatic dragons, based on the evil mother of all dragons from Babylonian mythology.

Publication history
The classification of "chromatic dragons" was used in the Advanced Dungeons & Dragons second edition Monstrous Manual (1993), although the dragons comprising the category had been in print since the original Dungeons & Dragons "white box" set (1974). The term continued to be used in the third, fourth and fifth editions of the Monster Manual.

The German magazine Envoyer commented that the artistic rendering of dragons in the game evolved positively through the editions, giving the different races more distinctive characteristics aside from color.

Primary types

Other chromatic dragons
This is a list of other dragons which are based on colors, but are not truly related to other chromatic dragons. In 4th edition, the gray, brown, and purple dragons were released in Draconomicon, but the grey and purple dragons were different. Instead of being based on the dragons listed here, they were based on the fang and deep dragons of 3rd edition.

Reception
The young adult black dragon was ranked first among the ten best mid-level monsters by the authors of Dungeons & Dragons For Dummies. The young white dragon was ranked eighth among the ten best low-level monsters by the authors of Dungeons & Dragons For Dummies. The authors chose the young white dragon over a wyrmling, feeling that "it's more satisfying for characters to battle against a dragon that's at least as big as a person, if not bigger. The young white dragon offers the best chance for this kind of fight". Dant et al. called the red dragon "deadly", and "one of the most fearsome and classic monsters" in role-playing games.

Metallic dragons 
Metallic dragon is a classification of dragon found in the role playing game Dungeons & Dragons. In this setting metallic dragons are of good alignment. Bahamut is the deity of good-aligned dragons and metallic dragons, and currently the only known Platinum dragon in existence. Metallic dragons have played a large role in D&D's various monster compilation books, and for most of the game's history five main types - brass, copper, bronze, silver, and gold - were presented as roughly analogous to the five types of chromatic dragons. The fourth edition of the game's second Monster Manual substituted iron and adamantine dragons for brass and bronze, and released the latter dragons in a later book alongside cobalt, mercury, mithral, orium, and steel dragons.

Publication history
The classification of "metallic dragons" was used in the Advanced Dungeons & Dragons second edition Monstrous Manual (1993), although the gold(en) dragon first appeared in the original Dungeons & Dragons "white box" set (1974) and the other dragons comprising the category had been in print since the first edition Monster Manual (1977). The term was continued in use in the third edition and fourth edition Monster Manual.

Common types

Rare types

Gem dragons 
Gem dragons are a classification of dragon based on "gem type rather than color or metal". They are typically of neutral alignment with respect to good and evil, but some kinds are quite egoistic and awful company nevertheless. The Gem dragon family comprise Amethyst Dragons, Crystal Dragons, Emerald Dragons, Sapphire Dragons, and Topaz Dragons. Sardior is the deity of gem dragons. Although Obsidian Dragons are also technically gem dragons, they are opposed to Sardior and most other gem dragons.

Publication history
The gem dragons (the amethyst dragon, the crystal dragon, the emerald dragon, the sapphire dragon and the topaz dragon) and Sardior the Ruby Dragon first appeared in the first edition in Dragon #37 (May 1980).

The gem dragons appeared in the second edition in the Monstrous Compendium Fiend Folio Appendix (1992), and the Monstrous Manual (1993). They appeared as player character races in the Council of Wyrms set (1994) and the Campaign Option: Council of Wyrms book (1999).

The gem dragons appeared in the third edition in Monster Manual II (2002).

They appeared in the fifth edition for the first time in Fizban's Treasury of Dragons (2021).

Types
Amethyst dragon
 Breath weapon: Line of force (prior to edition 3.5 an explosive lozenge)
 Terrain: Inner Planes, underground
 Alignment: Always neutral

The most powerful of the neutral gem dragons, amethyst dragons are honorable, regal creatures. They inhabit the mountains of the northern islands, living on the shores of isolated lakes and pools. At birth, these dragons have lavender skin with fine, translucent-purple scales. These scales darken as the creature grows older, eventually reaching a sparkling lavender color.
These creatures approach life with a detached air, ignoring the conflicts of good and evil, law and chaos. At best, they see these conflicts as petty squabbles over inconsequential points of view, and not worthy of their time or consideration. These majestic dragons consider themselves to be the leaders of the gem dragons, and most of the lesser gem dragons acquiesce to this leadership – in everyday life and in the Council Aerie.

While amethyst dragons consider their silver and copper cousins to be foolish and have an active dislike of red and white dragons, they do not consider any life form to be their inherent enemies. They prefer to reason out a settlement through discussion and negotiation rather than through combat, but they can and will fight if they must. Being honourable and noble, these dragons never hide or attempt to ambush foes. To them, even retreating is a dishonourable action, but they will flee if faced with certain death.
Amethyst dragons eat large quantities of fish and gems. They keep vassals to attend to their needs, though they do not place as many restrictions or requirements on them as other dragon lords do. Most keep at least one hidden, underwater cave for seclusion and secrecy.
Amethyst dragons approach mating in a very logical manner, seeking the optimum partner to produce the best offspring. Love and pleasure rarely, if ever, enter the equation.

Crystal dragon
 Breath weapon: Line of blinding light
 Terrain: Inner Planes, temperate and cold mountains
 Alignment: Always chaotic neutral

The friendly crystal dragons of Io's Blood's northern isles spend much time trying to learn about world around them. They value friendship over all else and the treasures tend to be sentimental rather than valuable, they welcome visitors who come to them with good intentions.

Hatchlings have glossy white scales that become more and more translucent with age. By the time they reach adulthood, these scales become luminescent in moonlight. In the full light of the day they glow with a dazzling, almost unbearable brilliance.

Fun-loving and mischievous, crystal dragons tend to be irresponsible rulers. For the daily running of their domains, these dragons rely on their vassals to keep things going. They establish domains in the cold, open northern reaches, building castles out of snow and ice. They leave these castles open to the sky, for they love to watch the stars on clear, cold nights. The white dragon clans consider crystal dragons to be nothing more than prey, so the two types are almost always in conflict. The crystal dragons also have little love for the tribes of giants that live beyond the Ice Sea and often come south to enslave the small, relatively weak gem dragons.

Like other benevolent dragons, the crystal dragons prefer to talk rather than fight. Even without special abilities, they can be charming and engaging to an extreme. Gems and metal ores are their foods of choice.
They mate with willing partners whenever they want, as desire and need move them. It has also been known for crystal dragons to adopt white dragon hatchlings.

Emerald dragon
 Breath weapon: Powerful burst of wind.
 Terrain: Inner Planes, underground (prefers inactive or extinct volcanoes)
 Alignment: Always lawful neutral

Emerald dragons live among the tropical islands in the Io's Blood chain's southern waters. They are a curious species, taken to keeping track of history, lore and customs. They tend to be very reclusive, suspicious that others covet their treasure hoards and territory.

Hatchlings have translucent green scales, which harden and take on many shades of green as they age. These scales are scintillating in the light, giving an emerald dragon's hide the appearance of being in constant motion.

A desire for privacy runs through the emerald clans, going so far as to determine where the dragon lords and their spawn establish lairs. In the southern islands, emerald dragons built their domains around the inactive volcano range that stretches across the tropical isles. Only their most trusted vassals are permitted to serve them within the main lairs. The others tend to duties throughout the rest of the domain.

The primary lairs consist of traps and alarms designed to warn the dragon of visitor and other threats. Emerald dragons prefer to quietly observe intruders and rarely emerge from hiding. If parlay is called for, they send their kindred or chief vassals to handle such duties while they watch, hidden, from cover. When forced into combat, emerald dragons prefer to attack by ambush, using stealth and surprise attacks to quickly disable their enemies. If the threat prove to be too great to handle, an emerald dragon will not hesitate to retreat. However, it will plan revenge, and its patience can last for centuries if need be.

Emerald dragons have no compunctions about what they eat. They prefer lizards and giants, but they will eat anything in a pinch. Of all the other type of dragonkind, emerald dragons get along best with the sapphire dragons, often controlling parallel domains (emerald dragons taking the surface, sapphire dragon the subterranean areas below). They fear the red dragon clans because of their well-known greed, and they are usually in open conflict with the fire giants from beyond the Burning Sea. Emeralds like the security and protection offered by a trusted partner and will take a single mate for a long time.

Sapphire dragon
 Breath weapon: Cone of panicking sound
 Terrain: Inner Planes, underground
 Alignment: Always lawful neutral

The sapphire dragons of the Io's Blood Isles control subterranean domains beneath two of the larger southern islands. While most of the territory above their realms belongs to the emerald dragons, they keep a small portion of the surface area as their own as well as the extensive caverns beneath the tropical jungles.

From birth, sapphire dragons are beautiful, with scale ranging from light to dark blue in color, which sparkle in the light. Because of their coloration, they are sometimes mistaken for blue dragons.

Of all dragonkind, perhaps the sapphire dragon clans are the most militaristic. They fervently protect their territory from outsiders, going so far as to distrust anyone who even gets close to their borders. They work to keep their vassals in peak fighting condition, maintaining some of the best-trained armies in the isles. As most of the territory that interests the sapphire clans is below the ground, they rarely come into conflict with other dragon clans unless they attempt to take caverns currently in use. Only the black dragons compete with them for the tropical underground, and even they are wary of going into direct conflict with the armies of the sapphire clans.

Most of the demihuman vassals serving the sapphire dragons are either dwarves or gnomes, as these races have no problems living and working beneath the ground. Also, elves are too much like drow, whom these dragons consider to be one of their natural enemies. Dwarven vassals are treated little better than slaves, as the two species were once at war, and they are almost never granted the kindred bond. This honour is usually reserved for gnome only.

Giant spiders make up most of a sapphire dragon's diet, and great hunts are conducted in the tunnels to find these delicacies. When a dragon lord feeling particularly lazy, it will send its dwarven vassals into the tunnels in search of the spiders. Of course, they must capture the spiders alive.

While militaristic and warlike, the sapphire dragons are not quick to attack. They prefer to observe intruders (all visitors are intruders) so that they can plan how to deal with them. If drow or dwarves from another clan approach, they are immediately attacked. Others can often at least make some gesture of friendship or parlay before being told to leave. If a sapphire dragon or its treasure is ever threatened, it attacks immediately with its breath weapon, spells, and physical attacks. It uses psionics and special abilities to escape if faced with a more powerful foe. Sapphire dragons take a single mate for long periods of time, however sapphires seek to possess a mate to enhance their prestige and status more than other reasons

Topaz dragon
 Breath weapon: Cone of dehydration
 Terrain: Inner Planes, any aquatic
 Alignment: Always chaotic neutral

Topaz dragons inhabit the coastal regions of the temperate islands, building lairs below the waterline, though constructing them so they remain dry. Clannish and self-seeking, these gem dragons usually want little to do with the other inhabitants of the isles. They keep vassals to fill their domain and make them appear as prosperous as their neighbors, and they participate in the Council activities on occasion, but for the most part these dragons neither seek company nor welcome it.

Out of the egg, a topaz dragon is a dull yellow-orange in color. With the age, its scales harden and become translucent and faceted. When it reaches adulthood, a topaz dragon sparkles in the light of the sun.

While topaz dragons enjoy the feel of sea wind and spray on their faceted-scale hides, they do not particularly like the water. They swim to hunt, attack, or reach their lairs, but not for enjoyment. They do love to eat fish and other sea creatures, especially the tasty giant squids that live in the Coral Sea.

While not malicious, topaz dragons are not the best of company or particularly pleasant to deal with. Besides caring little for social graces, they display erratic behavior that is unsettling and very confusing. They dislike visitors, but tend to avoid combat if they can help it. If combat is unavoidable, they use tricks and promises to distract their foes before striking with teeth and claws (which they enjoy using).

Unless it specifically interests or affect them, topaz dragons tend to be indifferent to the causes and concerns that occupy the rest of dragonkind. They dislike bronze dragons and usually oppose the interests of those clans.

It takes time for a topaz dragon to accept another dragon's friendship, but once it does it remains a friend for life. Once another dragon gets past its outer defenses and gruff exterior, it finds a loyal companion and ready protector in the topaz dragon.

Other gem dragons
Obsidian dragon
 Breath weapon: Cone of fire
 Terrain: Warm mountains and underground, demiplanes
 Alignment: Always neutral

Obsidian dragons, while the most intelligent of the gem dragons, are also the most vicious. They are extremely haughty, anger easily, and like to toy with prey before finishing it off.

An obsidian dragon has smooth black skin with razor edges where joints come together. When first hatched, their scales are gray, rough to touch, and well defined. As they get older, the scales darken, become smoother, and begin to blend together.

Most obsidian dragons prefer to make their lairs around volcanoes or in one of the mountains of coal found on the Elemental Plane of Fire. Most great wyrms, though, make use of the genesis power to create their own demiplane.

Reception
Reviewer Mark Theurer remarked that gem dragons "have some interesting breath weapons".

Catastrophic dragons 
Catastrophic dragons are typically of neutral alignment. They are Avalanche Dragon, the Blizzard Dragon, the Earthquake dragon, the Tornado Dragon, the Typhoon Dragon, Volcanic Dragon, and the Wildfire Dragon.  Catastrophic dragons pay their homage to the Primordials as opposed to any other dragon deity.  After the defeat of Io, there was a group of dragons that defected to the side of Primordials. The Primordials transformed these dragons into beings imbued with the elemental chaos.  Metallic and Chromatic Dragons view Catastrophic dragons as aberrations.

Lung dragons 
The Lung dragons, originally known as Oriental dragons, are all of neutral alignment with respect to good and evil. They are wingless creatures, and fly by innate magical means. Lung dragons can have any colour despite their specific type. These dragons are derived from Chinese mythology.

Oriental dragons appeared for the first time in the original Fiend Folio (1981), including the li lung (earth dragon), the lung wang (sea dragon), the pan lung (coiled dragon), the shen lung (spirit dragon), the t'ien lung (celestial dragon), and the yu lung (carp dragon). Two more were added in the 1st edition Oriental Adventures book, the chiang lung (river dragon) and the tun mi lung (typhoon dragon).  The Lung dragons later appeared in the Monstrous Compendium Forgotten Realms Appendix (1989).

These creatures appeared in third edition under the "lung dragon" heading in Oriental Adventures (2001).

Ferrous dragons 
Ferrous Dragons are typically of lawful alignment. They are the Iron Dragon, the Nickel Dragon, the Tungsten Dragon, the Cobalt Dragon, and the Chromium Dragon. They originated in Dragon Magazine. All Ferrous dragons can sense ordinary metals and the lawful ferrous dragons have a strict hierarchy, with the higher dragons dictating the laws to the lower ones. The hierarchy, from highest to lowest, is iron, chromium, cobalt, tungsten, and nickel. Gruaghlothor is the supreme ruler of the ferrous dragons.

Chromium Dragon

 Breath weapon: Line of solid ice (cold damage) and cone of freezing crystals (Dexterity damage)
 Terrain: Subterranean or mountainous arctic climes
 Alignment: Lawful Evil
 Appears in: Dragon #356
Shining, dull silver dragons that did not seem to match up in description to silver, steel, or mithril dragons were mentioned. These dragons had a breath weapon that fired forth freezing crystal. These dragons appear to have a particularly malevolent nature to them.

Cobalt Dragon

 Breath weapon: Line of pulsing magnetic energy (force damage plus Bull Rush check)
 Terrain: Deep dark forest or thick jungle
 Alignment: Lawful Evil
 Appears in: Dragon #356
Midnight blue dragons that could fire a breath weapon of pulsing, barely perceptible energy. These dragons, like the chromium dragons, were foul of temper, but subservient to iron dragons and their lord.

Iron Dragon

 Breath weapon: Cone of superheated sparks (fire and electric damage) and cone of sleep gas
 Terrain: Hills and mountains containing iron ore
 Alignment: Lawful Neutral
 Appears in: Dragon #356

Nickel Dragon

 Breath weapon: Cone of corrosive gas (acid damage)
 Terrain: Swamp and marshland
 Alignment: Lawful Evil
 Appears in: Dragon #356
This form of dragon had grey and white metallic scales and could breathe corrosive gas as a weapon.

Tungsten Dragon

 Breath weapon: Cone of hot sand (fire and bludgeoning damage)
 Terrain: Arid deserts and steppes, dry plains in temperate or warmer regions
 Alignment: Lawful Good
 Appears in: Dragon #356
A species that appeared to be generally benevolent, there was a species of ferrous dragon, one whose breath weapon was composed of superheated sand and bludgeoning sand, that seemed especially set upon fighting chromatic dragons and other forms of powerful evil. This form of dragon has metallic scales that are a dull green with grey.

Planar dragons 
Planar dragons inhabit the outer planes.

Shadow dragon
 Breath weapon: Energy-draining shadows
 Terrain: Underground, Shadow Material Plane
 Alignment: Always Chaotic evil
 Appears in: AD&D 1st Edition Monster Manual II (1983) and reprinted on several other occasions, including: AD&D 2nd Edition adventure Night Below; computer game Baldur's Gate II. A shadow dragon called Shimmergloom is the ruler of a clan of Duergar in the second book of the Icewind Dale Trilogy, Streams of Silver; Erevis Cale and his companions encounter a shadow dragon named Furlinastis on several occasions in the Twilight war trilogy. Also appeared in the D&D 5th Edition Monster Manual.

Adamantite dragon

 Breath weapon: White-hot fire, Hold monster gas
 Terrain: Twin Paradises of Bytopia
 Alignment: Neutral Good
 Notes: Oversized natural weapons, Can destroy Adamantium fortresses. Also, they look like they are made of jet-black metal.

Adamantite dragons are perhaps the mightiest of dragonkind. They are the epitome of good, sacrificing whatever is necessary for the common good of intelligent creatures everywhere. These other-planar creatures are strange among dragonkind, since they are born with their shining coats of adamantite fully developed (explaining their very high armor class even when hatchlings). This mighty coat is a shining silver color that reflects light in brilliant, scintillating beams and rainbows-refreshing to those who can bask in its goodness, painful to those who hide in the shadows of evil.

Adamantite dragons speak their own tongue and the language of all good dragons. By their juvenile years (age category 4), they will speak common. By the time they are adults (age, category 6), they are 50% likely to speak any language of dragonkind.

Combat: Due to the adamantite dragons strong taste for physical battle, they may use the extra attack forms of dragons (wing buffet, foot stomp, etc.) one age category earlier than other dragons.

Breath weapon/special abilities: An adamantite dragon has two breath weapons, one of which can only be used at certain times. The common form of breath weapon is a cone of flame 110' long, 10'wide at the dragon's mouth, and 45'wide at the end- This is a magical flame and will ignite even nonflammable materials.

The adamantite dragon's second breath weapon projects an area of time stop. It has the same dimensions as the cone of flame. Anyone caught in the area must save vs., spells or be affected as if by a time stop spell cast at 20th level of magic use - This breath weapon may only be used on the dragon's home plane (Twin Paradises), when the dragons are defending the plane, and even then only one time per day.

Adamantite dragons may use the following spell-like abilities: 
 polymorph self, 3 times per day, permanent, may revert to dragon form without restriction 
 magic missile, (adults and older), five missiles per round 
 blink, (mature adults and older)

Due to their extra-planar nature, all adamantite dragons are immune to non-magical weapons.

Habitat/Society: The adamantite dragons are the self-appointed guardians of the Twin Paradises. These great creatures are extremely powerful and will come to the aid of any intelligent creature. They are unconcerned with law or chaos, but only the protection of sentient lifeforms.

Ecology: Adamantite dragons have little place in the ecosystem of the Twin Paradises, They can, however, be avaricious hunters with huge appetites. Adamantite dragons have no moral objection to hunting unintelligent life forms.

Arboreal dragon

 Breath weapon: Razor-sharp thorns
 Terrain: Olympian Glades of Arborea
 Alignment: Chaotic Good

Astral dragon

 Breath weapon: Dismissal effect, scouring dust
 Terrain: Astral Plane
 Alignment: True Neutral

Axial dragon

 Breath weapon: Force
 Terrain: Clockwork Nirvana of Mechanus
 Alignment: Lawful Neutral
 Notes: Immune to a vast number of things, including acid, fire, cold, poison, and nonlethal damage.

Battle dragon

 Breath weapon: Sonic energy, Fear gas
 Terrain: Heroic Domains of Ysgard
 Alignment: Neutral Good

Beast dragon

 Breath weapon: Lightning
 Terrain: Wilderness of the Beastlands
 Alignment: Chaotic Good or Neutral Good

Chaos dragon

 Breath weapon: Random elemental blast (acid, cold, electricity, fire, sound, etc.), Confusion gas
 Terrain: Ever-Changing Chaos of Limbo
 Alignment: Any Chaotic

Chole dragon

 Breath weapon: Poisonous insanity vapors
 Terrain: Infinite Layers of the Abyss
 Alignment: Chaotic Evil

Concordant dragon

 Breath weapon: Antithetical energy
 Terrain: Concordant Domain of the Outlands
 Alignment: True Neutral

Ectoplasmic dragon

 Breath weapon: Whitefire, sticky ectoplasm.
 Terrain: Astral Plane
 Alignment: Chaotic Neutral

Elysian dragon

 Breath weapon: Sonic energy, inebriation gas
 Terrain: Blessed Fields of Elysium
 Alignment: Neutral Good

Ethereal dragon

 Breath weapon: Force
 Terrain: Ethereal Plane
 Alignment: True Neutral

Gloom dragon

 Breath weapon: Apathy gas
 Terrain: Gray Waste of Hades
 Alignment: Neutral Evil

Howling dragon

 Breath weapon: Howling sound, Maddening wails
 Terrain: Windswept Depths of Pandemonium
 Alignment: Chaotic Evil or Chaotic Neutral

Kodragon

 Breath weapon: Shrinking, reverse shrinking
 Terrain: Astral Plane

Oceanus dragon

 Breath weapon: Lightning, Tranquility gas
 Terrain: Upper Planes
 Alignment: Neutral Good

Pyroclastic dragon

 Breath weapon: cone of superheated ash accompanied by waves of crushing sonic force, Disintegrating line
 Terrain: Bleak Eternity of Gehenna
 Alignment: Lawful Evil or Neutral Evil

Radiant dragon

 Breath weapon: Force, Light
 Terrain: Seven Mounting Heavens of Celestia
 Alignment: Lawful Good

Rust dragon

 Breath weapon: Acid, rusting liquid
 Terrain: Infernal Battlefield of Acheron
 Alignment: Lawful Neutral or Lawful Evil

Styx dragon

 Breath weapon: Acid, stupefying gas
 Terrain: Lower Planes
 Alignment: Neutral Evil

Tarterian dragon

 Breath weapon: Line of disruptive force, cone of will-sapping gas
 Terrain: Tarterian Depths of Carceri
 Alignment: Neutral Evil or Chaotic Evil
 Current Source: (3.5) Draconomicon 189

Hellfire Wyrm

 Breath weapon: Cone of Infernal Flame
 Terrain: The Nine Hells of Baator
 Alignment: Always Lawful Evil
 Current Source: (3.5) Monster Manual II 125

Faerûnian dragons

Brown dragon

 Breath weapon: Sludge
 Terrain: Bogs
 Alignment: Neutral
 Appears in: Monsters of Faerûn

Deep dragon

 Breath weapon: Flesh-corrosive gas
 Terrain: Underground - Underdark
 Alignment: Chaotic evil
 Appears in: Monsters of Faerûn and reprinted in Fane of the Drow as well as the Legacy of the Drow series. A mutant, two-headed deep dragon named Zz,pora appears in the "Starlight and Shadows" series. The most recent v3.5 statistics for deep dragons can be found in Drow of the Underdark. Appears in 4E Draconomicon as Purple Dragon.

Fang dragon

 Breath weapon: None (has a constitution-draining bite)
 Terrain: Mountains
 Alignment: Always Chaotic neutral
 Appears in: Monsters of Faerûn, 3E Draconomicon. Appears in 4E Draconomicon as Gray Dragon.

Rattelyr dragon

 Breath weapon: Cone of fire
 Terrain: Desert, the forest, grassy plains
 Alignment: Lawful Evil
 Appears in: Shining South

Song dragon

 Breath weapon: Electrically charged gas
 Terrain: Any land
 Alignment: Always either chaotic good or chaotic neutral
 Appears in: Monsters of Faerûn; "Year of Rogue Dragons" trilogy, "Elminster's Daughter".

Independent dragons

Incarnum dragon

 Breath weapon: Incarnum energy
 Terrain: Outer Planes
 Alignment: Lawful good, lawful evil, chaotic good or chaotic evil.
 Appears in: Magic of Incarnum

Sand dragon

 Breath weapon: Flaywind sand
 Terrain: Warm deserts
 Alignment: Chaotic Neutral
 Appears in: Sandstorm; 4th Edition Draconomicon as Brown Dragon.

Epic dragons

Force dragon

 Breath weapon: Force
 Terrain: Any
 Alignment: Usually Neutral
 Appears in: Epic Level Handbook

Prismatic dragon

 Breath weapon: Prismatic Spray
 Terrain: Any
 Alignment: Usually Neutral
 Appears in: Epic Level Handbook

Time dragon

 Breath weapon: Line of Ravaging Time and Cone of Time Expulsion
 Terrain: Anywhere they find air to breathe
 Alignment: Usually Neutral
 Appears in: Dragon #359

Arcane dragons

Hex dragon

 Breath weapon: Poison
 Terrain: Forest, marshes, underground
 Alignment: Neutral Evil
 Appears in: Dragon #343

Tome dragon

 Breath weapon: Elemental energy
 Terrain: Mountains
 Alignment: Lawful Neutral
 Appears in: Dragon #343

Other dragons 
Other species of true dragon that exist outside of the main dragon families include: Steel, Mercury, Pearl, Amber, Cloud, Mist, and many more.

Two comedic dragons that appeared in Dragon Magazine #156: The Pink Dragon, which had a cone breath weapon of bubbles (stung the eyes); and the Paper Dragon, which looked like a dog-sized folded paper dragon, which when slain left several spell scrolls from its remains.

Cerilian dragon

 Breath weapon: Cone of burning venom
 Terrain: Cerilia, any
 Alignment: Any, each has a specific personality
 Current Source: (2) Birthright Campaign Setting (3.5) BRCS

Lesser dragons 
Lesser Dragons comprise all dragonkind that are not true dragons, and includes a broad range of creatures.

Drakes 
Drakes are a large family of Lesser Dragons. They look like miniature versions of the much larger true dragons and sometimes acts as guards for the true dragons. Most drakes are of animal intelligence and can not speak, but they also have breath weapons and can be a dangerous opponent. Drakes can be subdued, and some subduers turn them into flying steeds or beasts of burden.

 Ambush drake
 Felldrake
 Rage drake

Elemental drakes are drakes most closely related to wyverns.  They hail from the Elemental Planes, and are sometimes used as mounts by jann. Unlike wyverns they are sentient.

 Air drake – Chaotic neutral drake with air mastery and blinding sandstorm.
 Earth drake – Lawful neutral drake with earth mastery and tremor.
 Fire drake – Neutral evil drake with heat attack.
 Ice drake – Chaotic evil drake with freezing touch.
 Magma drake – Lawful evil drake with burn attack.
 Ooze drake – Lawful evil drake with acid attack.
 Smoke drake – Chaotic evil drake with smoke breath weapon.
 Water drake – Neutral drake with water mastery and drench.

Dragonets 
Dragonet is a common term sometimes used for all minute Lesser Dragons. Technically they also include the Drakes.

Faerie dragons
Pseudodragons – Small dragon-like creatures that are stereotypically wizard's familiars.  They can communicate telepathically and their main weapon is a stinging, poisonous tail.
Spiretop dragons

Landwyrms 
Landwyrm is a family of Lesser Dragons that are mostly of an evil nature. They are cunning and can speak, but they have no wings and can not fly.

Linnorms 
Linnorms are ancient, primeval cousins of the true dragons. They lack wings and hind legs, making them more serpentine than true dragons. All known linnorms are evil and cruel. Linnorms are sometimes referred to as "Norse dragons". There are many subtypes of linnorms.

Reviewer Mark Theurer remarked about Linnorm dragons that these giant "dragon-like beings that might best be described as feral dragons" really peaked his interest. He characterized the gray linnorm as "small [for a Linnorm dragon], that means HUGE, and very aggressive", the dread linnorm as "the largest and has two frickin’ heads", and the Corpse Tearer as "old, smart, and vicious".

Other types 
Various other types of lesser dragons exist, including:

 Dracolisk
 Draconians
 Dracotaurs
 Dragon turtles
 Dragonnel
 Ssvaklor
 Wurms
 Wyverns

Critical reception
Dungeons & Dragons for Dummies assigned the dragon a central role, stating that for many characters "the opportunity to fight a dragon (and pillage its hoard) is the reason you play the game". The authors also chose a specific dragon each among the ten best monsters for low- and mid-level characters.

Jon Peterson described dragons in D&D as greedy for treasure. He found it ironic, that they became the iconic creature in the game to conquer for the characters, as accumulation of treasures was one major goal of the game - exactly what the folkloric and fantasy images of hoarding dragons preceding D&D warned against.

Similarly, Philip J. Clements wrote about Dungeons & Dragons: "Even the name suggests" that "both dungeons and dragons exist to be overcome and exploited by the power and cunning of the characters".

GameSpy author Allan Rausch commented on the improvements in the depiction of dragons in 3rd edition artwork: "Dragons were redesigned with an eye toward giving them distinctive characteristics that would work in their preferred environments -- making them distinctively D&D dragons."

The ancient blue dragon was ranked third among the ten best high-level 4th Edition monsters by the authors of Dungeons & Dragons 4th Edition For Dummies. The authors described the ancient dragons as "the most powerful versions of these majestic and deadly creatures, and the ancient blue dragon approaches the pinnacle of all dragon-kin", surpassed only by the red dragon. The authors concluded that "Few single challengers can stand long against the fury of this terrible dragon as it unleashes lightning and thunder."

Screen Rant compiled a list of the game's "10 Most Powerful (And 10 Weakest) Monsters, Ranked" in 2018, calling the prismatic dragon one of the strongest, saying "It represents the ultimate challenge for any party of adventurers, though it would easily dispose of all but the most insanely overleveled groups. Defeating a prismatic dragon would also represent the ultimate challenge for the actual players, as they would likely expire from old age before rolling all of the dice necessary to finish an encounter with the creature."

Other publishers
In 1981 Varanae published a supplement named Dragons detailing 50 new dragon types in the format of a Monster Manual. In 1986 a scenario also titled Dragons was published by Mayfair Games, with a war between good and evil dragons as backdrop, and including more background material about dragons.

The black dragon, blue dragon, brass dragon, bronze dragon, copper dragon, gold dragon, green dragon, red dragon, silver dragon, and white dragon are fully detailed in Paizo Publishing's book Dragons Revisited (2009).

Notes

References

Other sources
Wyatt, James and Rob Heinsoo. Monstrous Compendium: Monsters of Faerun (Wizards of the Coast, 2001).
Andy Collins, Skip Williams, and James Wyatt. Draconomicon (Wizards of the Coast, 2003).

Further reading

External links
Wyrms of the North Archive
Bricken, Rob (27 February 2015). "The 16 Strangest Dragons In Dungeons & Dragons". io9. Accessed 25 December 2016.

Dragons in popular culture
Dungeons & Dragons creatures from folklore and mythology
Dungeons & Dragons monsters